The 2011 USA Sevens competition was held on February 12 and February 13 at Sam Boyd Stadium in the Las Vegas, Nevada area. The USA Sevens is played annually as part of the IRB Sevens World Series for international rugby sevens (seven-a-side version of rugby union). It was the fourth of eight events in the 2010–11 IRB Sevens World Series.

Format
The tournament consisted of four round-robin pools of four teams. All sixteen teams progressed to the knockout stage. The top two teams from each group progressed to quarter-finals in the main competition, with the winners of those quarter-finals competing in cup semi-finals and the losers competing in plate semi-finals. The bottom two teams from each group progressed to quarter-finals in the consolation competition, with the winners of those quarter-finals competing in bowl semi-finals and the losers competing in shield semi-finals.

Teams
These 16 teams are invited to participate in the 2011 tournament:

Pool stages

Pool A

Pool B

Pool C

Pool D

Knockout

Shield

Bowl

Plate

Cup

References

External links

USA Sevens
USA Sevens
Usa Sevens 2011
USA Sevens
2011 in American rugby union